Edward John Renehan Jr. (born c 1956) is an American writer, consultant, publisher, and Grammy Award-winning musician.

Early life and music
Renehan grew up in the Long Island village of Valley Stream, New York, where he attended school with future actor/director Steve Buscemi, and at age 13 began learning the guitar. He studied blues guitar with the Reverend Gary Davis in New York as a teenager. By 20, he was playing and recording with folksingers Pete Seeger and Don McLean, among others. In 1976, he and Seeger recorded "Fifty Sail on Newburgh Bay: Hudson Valley Songs Old & New Sung by Pete Seeger and Ed Renehan." Several of the tracks Renehan recorded with Seeger reappeared in 2019 as part of the six-CD, table-top book retrospective "Pete Seeger: The Smithsonian Folkways Collection"  which won the Grammy Award for Best Historical Album.

In his early twenties he performed with Happy Traum, Artie Traum and others at various venues and folk festivals in the North East. Renehan stopped playing professionally in 1980, and only rarely ventured onto stages thereafter.

Publishing and Consulting
Renehan graduated from State University of New York at New Paltz.
He thereafter worked for several New York publishing companies, focusing on the developing domain of digital publishing, including e-publishing and print-on-demand (POD) technologies. His tenure included 7 years as Director of Computer Publishing Programs for MBCI/Macmillan, now a part of Bookspan.

From 1994, he worked as an independent consultant and author, including writing books on the Kennedys, Jay Gould, Cornelius Vanderbilt and John Burroughs, as well as best-selling books about computers and computing. During this period he wrote books published by Doubleday, Crown, Oxford University Press, Basic Books, McGraw Hill, Simon & Schuster, Chelsea House, and other firms.

In 2010 Renehan founded New Street Communications, an enterprise focused on audio, digital, and POD editions of books in a range of fields. The firm includes two subsidiaries: Dark Hall Press (which publishes original horror and science fiction titles), and New Street Nautical Audio, which publishes sailing related audiobooks. According to a July 2013 report in the Providence Business News, the combined New Street firms had revenues of more than $200,000 in the 2012 fiscal year, which was the enterprise's second full year of operation. As of June 2015, the firm had 85 titles in print.

Renehan is also an in-demand ghost-writer focusing for the most part on finance and serving the book, essay, and article writing needs of a number of clients on Wall Street and elsewhere.

Family and affiliations
Renehan is married and lives in the village of Wickford, Rhode Island. He is the father of two grown children, and a grandfather. He has served on several nonprofit boards, including  the Hudson River Sloop Clearwater. He is active in the Electronic Frontier Foundation — the co-founder of which, John Perry Barlow, sat on the New Street Editorial Board until his death in 2018. With Stewart Brand and others, he is a founding member of The Long Now Foundation. He is an avid sailor.

Works (partial list)
Deliberate Evil: Nathaniel Hawthorne, Daniel Webster, and the 1830 Murder of a Salem Slave Trader
The Life of Charles Stewart Mott: Industrialist, Philanthropist, Mr. Flint
The Enkert Dossiers
Desperate Voyage: Donald Crowhurst, The London Sunday Times Golden Globe Race, and the Tragedy of Teignmouth Electron
Dylan at Newport, 1965: Music, Myth, and Un-Meaning
Pete Seeger vs. The Un-Americans: A Tale of the Blacklist
Understanding Kerouac's ON THE ROAD
Dark Genius of Wall Street: The Misunderstood Life of Jay Gould, King of the Robber Barons
The Kennedys at War
The Secret Six: The True Tale of the Men Who Conspired with John Brown
John Burroughs: An American Naturalist
Commodore: The Life of Cornelius Vanderbilt
The Lion's Pride: Theodore Roosevelt and his Family in Peace and War

References

External links

New Street Communications
Renehan's Personal Web Site
Ed Renehan Essays on medium.com

Ed Renehan on Goodreads

1956 births
Living people
American publishers (people)
21st-century American non-fiction writers
State University of New York at New Paltz alumni
People from Valley Stream, New York
21st-century American historians
21st-century American male writers
Historians from New York (state)
American male non-fiction writers